The boys' slopestyle event in freestyle skiing at the 2020 Winter Youth  Olympics took place on 20 January at the Leysin Park & Pipe.

Qualification
The qualification was started at 09:30.

Final
The final was started at 12:20.

References

 
Boys' slopestyle